"How 'bout Them Cowgirls" is a song written by Casey Beathard and Ed Hill, and recorded by American country music singer George Strait.  It was released in August 2007 as the fourth single from his album It Just Comes Natural.  The song reached number 3 on the Billboard Hot Country Songs chart and peaked at number 49 on the U.S. Billboard Hot 100.  It also peaked at number 67 on the Canadian Hot 100.

Content
"How 'bout Them Cowgirls" is a mid-tempo in which the narrator states that he has been all across America and seen many things, but all he can think about and say is "how 'bout them cowgirls". The title of the song is a play on the phrase "How 'bout them Cowboys?"

Critical reception
Kevin John Coyne reviewing the song for Country Universe gave the song a favorable rating stating that "what seems like a pedestrian celebration of cowgirls on the surface features several interesting layers underneath, including social commentary on female independence and the increasing urbanization of the American West."

Chart performance

Year-end charts

Certifications

References

Songs about cowboys and cowgirls
2007 singles
George Strait songs
Songs written by Casey Beathard
Songs written by Ed Hill
Song recordings produced by Tony Brown (record producer)
MCA Nashville Records singles
2007 songs